In enzymology, a butanal dehydrogenase is an enzyme that catalyzes the chemical reaction

butanal + CoA + NAD(P)+  butanoyl-CoA + NAD(P)H + H+

The 4 substrates of this enzyme are butanal, CoA, NAD+, and NADP+, whereas its 4 products are butanoyl-CoA, NADH, NADPH, and H+.

This enzyme belongs to the family of oxidoreductases, specifically those acting on the aldehyde or oxo group of donor with NAD+ or NADP+ as acceptor.  The systematic name of this enzyme class is butanal:NAD(P)+ oxidoreductase (CoA-acylating). This enzyme participates in butanoate metabolism.

References

 

EC 1.2.1
NADPH-dependent enzymes
NADH-dependent enzymes
Enzymes of unknown structure